Concrete is a live album by the British band Pet Shop Boys. It was released on 23 October 2006.
Due to be called Concert, on 20 September 2006, Pet Shop Boys announced that the album was going to be called Concrete, which was the title that they originally wanted for the album. It is the first live concert to be released by the band on Audio CD.

The concert
The performance recorded for the album took place at the Mermaid Theatre on 8 May 2006, as an exclusive for broadcast on BBC Radio 2's Sold on Song programme. Attendance, totalling 600, was by invitation or through winning competitions held by Radio 2 and the band's official website. The event was hosted by the BBC's Stuart Maconie.

The 27 May Radio 2 broadcast included an interview conducted by Maconie, but excluded four songs from the running order ("You Only Tell Me You Love Me When You're Drunk", "After All", "Numb", and "Dreaming of the Queen"). The full concert was later broadcast on BBC 6 Music on 28 August.

Song selection

Due to the presence of the orchestra, the setlist was composed to consist of songs originally recorded with an orchestra. Consequently, aside from an extensive selection of songs from Fundamental, various non-studio album tracks were chosen, including the arrangement of "Rent" from the Liza Minnelli album Results, originally arranged by Angelo Badalamenti; "After All", the portion of the band's Battleship Potemkin soundtrack that accompanies the Odessa Steps sequence from the film (performed with the scene projected on a screen in the background); "Friendly Fire", from the Closer to Heaven musical; and "Nothing Has Been Proved", the theme song from Scandal, also arranged by Badalamenti.

"West End Girls" and "It's a Sin" were the only exceptions to the rule, and were reworked to integrate the orchestra.

Personnel
Pet Shop Boys are:
 Neil Tennant
 Chris Lowe

Other musicians:
 Trevor Horn – music director, bass and backing vocals
 The BBC Concert Orchestra
 Pete Gleadall – programming 
 Nick Ingman – conductor
 Anne Dudley – piano, keyboards
 Phil Palmer – guitar
 Steve Lipson – guitar
 Paul Robinson – drums
 Lol Creme – backing vocals
 Andy Caine – backing vocals
 Lucinda Barry – backing vocals
 Sylvia Mason-James – backing vocals
 Sally Bradshaw – opera singer

Guest singers:
 Rufus Wainwright
 Frances Barber
 Robbie Williams

Track listing

CD one
"Left to My Own Devices" (8:37)
"Rent" (3:56)
"You Only Tell Me You Love Me When You're Drunk" (3:31)
"The Sodom and Gomorrah Show" (5:33)
"Casanova in Hell" (sung by Rufus Wainwright) (3:40)
"After All" (7:56)
"Friendly Fire" (sung by Frances Barber) (3:57)
"Integral" (4:01)

CD two
"Numb" (5:03)
"It's Alright" (5:03)
"Luna Park" (6:21)
"Nothing Has Been Proved" (4:40)
"Jealousy" (sung by Robbie Williams) (5:57)
"Dreaming of the Queen" (5:28)
"It's a Sin" (5:18)
"Indefinite Leave to Remain" (2:59)
"West End Girls" (4:55)

References

External links

The concert
 Pet Shop Boys official site All official announcements
 BBC Radio 2 - Sold on Song Concert page, with photos
 Boywatch Fan review

Pet Shop Boys albums
Albums produced by Trevor Horn
2006 live albums